Middlesex 2 was an English level 11 Rugby Union league with teams from north-west London taking part.  Promoted teams moved up to Middlesex 1 and relegation was to Middlesex 3.  The division was cancelled in at the end of the 1995–96 campaign after nine seasons due to the merger of the Hertfordshire and Middlesex regional leagues.

Original teams
When league rugby began in 1987 this division contained the following teams:

Antlers
Barclays Bank
Centaurs
CS Stags 1863
Hackney
London Cornish
Old Abbots
Old Hamptonians
Osterley
Pinner & Grammarians
St. Bart's Hospital
Thamesians

Middlesex 2 honours

Middlesex 2 (1987–1992)

The original Middlesex 2 was a tier 9 league with promotion up to Middlesex 1 and relegation was to Middlesex 3.

Middlesex 2 (1992–1996)

The creation of Herts/Middlesex at the beginning of the 1992–93 season meant that Middlesex 2 dropped to become a tier 10 league.  The introduction of National 5 South for the 1993–94 season meant that Middlesex 3 dropped another level to become a tier 11 league for the years that National 5 South was active.  Promotion continued to Middlesex 1 and relegation to Middlesex 3.  The merging of the Hertfordshire and Middlesex regional divisions at the end of the 1995–96 season meant that Middlesex 2 was cancelled.

Number of league titles

Enfield Ignatians (1)
Hackney (1)
Haringey Rhinos (1)
London Nigerian (1)
Old Abbots (1)
Old Hamptonians (1)
Old Meadonians 
Old Millhillians (1)
Old Paulines (1)

Notes

See also
London & SE Division RFU
Middlesex RFU
English rugby union system
Rugby union in England

References

Defunct rugby union leagues in England
Rugby union in Middlesex
Sports leagues established in 1987
Sports leagues disestablished in 1996